The Toyota Corolla Spacio is a compact MPV sold by Toyota under the Corolla nameplate. The "Spacio" nameplate was only used in Japan, where it was exclusive to Toyota Corolla Store dealerships. From 2001 in Europe, the second generation Corolla Spacio used the Corolla Verso nameplate instead.

The "Spacio" name is taken from the Italian word "spazio", which means "space".



First generation (E110; 1997) 

The first generation, introduced in January 1997, was introduced as a two box minivan which was technically similar to the Avensis. Its body panels were stamped by long time Toyota supplier Kanto Auto Works. The Spacio received a facelift in April 1999.

The first generation Corolla Spacio was available with 2-3, 2-0-2 and 2-2-2 seating options. The pre-facelift model was available in Standard, L Package, G Package and Black Sports Package grade levels. The facelift model was available in Standard, G Package and Aero Tourer grade levels.

In May 2000, the "White Pearl Limited" edition was released. Based on the Spacio 2-3 Standard grade 1.6L FF car and 1.8L 4WD car, the exclusive color Super White Pearl Mica is adopted for the exterior color and the exclusive color ivory is adopted for the interior color. In addition, the interior is specially equipped with plated side door handles, CD, cassette and audio with multi-electronic tuner.

Second generation (E120; 2001) 

The second generation Corolla Spacio was released in Japan in May 2001. It entered the European market as the first generation Corolla Verso later in the same year after being shown at the September 2001 Frankfurt Motor Show. The Spacio received a facelift in April 2003 for the Japanese market. It was discontinued in Japan in June 2007 and replaced by both the Corolla Rumion (5-seater) and Passo Sette (7-seater).

Markets

Japan 
The second generation Corolla Spacio was available in V, X and X "G-Edition" grade levels with either 1.5-litre 1NZ-FE or 1.8-litre 1ZZ-FE petrol engine option, as well as S Aero Tourer grade with only 1.8-litre petrol engine option offered. The four-wheel drive option was only available for 1.8-litre petrol engine option. Only 4-speed automatic transmission option was offered for the Japanese market. The V grade was dropped for the facelifted model.

The Japanese market Corolla Spacio has a third row seat that can be folded for storage space.

Europe 

In the United Kingdom, the first generation Corolla Verso was launched on 2 January 2002, along with the E120 series Corolla. It was available in T2 grade with 1.6-litre 3ZZ-FE petrol engine, as well as T3 and T Spirit grade levels with 1.8-litre 1ZZ-FE petrol engine. 2.0-litre 1CD-FTV diesel engine was also available for all grades. 5-speed manual transmission option was available for all grades, but 4-speed automatic option was only available for 1.8-litre petrol-powered T3 and T Spirit grades. The European market Corolla Verso was only available in 5-seater.

References 

Spacio
Compact MPVs
Euro NCAP small MPVs
Cars introduced in 2001
Cars discontinued in 2007
2000s cars
Front-wheel-drive vehicles